The city of London has long been a subject for panoramas by artists, mapmakers, and topographers. Many of their works have this as their title.

History
The earliest topographical drawings preceded maps according to modern definition, although they were mainly based on surveys or multiple drawings reduced to a (fairly) consistent perspective, as it is clearly impossible for them to have been produced from any single real viewpoint, unlike modern photographic panoramas. Wenceslaus Hollar's 1647 Long View of London from Bankside is an exception. Projected from a single viewpoint it resembles the perspective of a modern panoramic photograph.

Panoramas
Amongst the earliest known is that by  Flemish topographer Anton van den Wyngaerde, produced in 1543 and published by London Topographical Society in 1881 with key added on bottom as reproduced here:

Others include Van Visscher's of 1616:

Wenceslaus Hollar's Long View of London from Bankside of 1647:

Another by Hollar, 1666

Many modern panoramic photographs of London exist, from many different viewpoints:

Interactive panoramas

Google Street View, a technology featured in Google Maps and Google Earth, provides connected and interactive panoramas from locations around the world, including throughout all of London, with views outdoors and indoors.

In Google Maps, when a user clicks on the yellow figure (named "Pegman"), that activates the street view map layer, which shows blue lines and blue circles superimposed upon the map, which represent what Street View panoramas are available. In order to see panoramas of those locations, the user either clicks on, or drags and drops Pegman onto, a blue line or blue circle on the map.

Street panoramas are all connected along solid blue lines, so that the user may virtually "drive" around on London streets from one panorama to the next (by clicking with the mouse pointer in the view), and look around in all directions from any point along the journey (by swiping the picture in the desired direction, or clicking on the compass-like rotation icon). Some off-street panoramas are connected with (typically dotted) blue lines to each other, while the blue circles on the map are standalone panoramas (called "image spheres"), which provide a single 360-degree view (usually with no connectivity to other views).

Some example Street Views from London's street system:
 Driving across the Tower Bridge
 Driving through Piccadilly Circus
 Driving past the giant lions at the base of Nelson's Column (look up), at Trafalgar Square

Some example Street View off-street panoramas in London:
 Watching the Royal Guard outside Buckingham Palace
 Inside the Natural History Museum
 Inside St. Paul's Cathedral
 View from a boat on the Thames, after going under the Westminster Bridge, passing the Palace of Westminster (the home of Parliament) and Big Ben
 A virtual tour through the art collections at the National Gallery
 Starting a virtual tour in the British Museum, at the Bust of Ramses

References

External links

London
Panorama photography
London in popular culture
History of the built environment of London